The Telefomin cuscus (Phalanger matanim) is a critically endangered possum found on New Guinea.

It is named after the Telefol ethnic group, who hunted the animal long before it was identified scientifically by the Australian zoologist Tim Flannery. It is believed to live only in the extremely restricted range of one valley's oak forests at altitudes between 1500 and 2000 m along a single river in the middle of Papua New Guinea: the Nong River Valley north of Telefomin. After 1997's drought, extremely cold weather ("bitter frosts") which killed the trees, and resulting wildfires, these forests were destroyed, which Flannery believes might have resulted in the species' extinction.

Habitat
This cuscus can or has been found in the areas of Telefomin and Tifalmin, and Papua New Guinea. It might be found even further northeast or west of the known collection areas. The only place where it is known with certainty was largely destroyed by a fire in 1998 which was caused by a drought during an El Niño.

References

Possums
Mammals of Papua New Guinea
Mammals described in 1987
Marsupials of New Guinea
Taxa named by Tim Flannery